The 1991–92 ACB season was the 9th season of the Liga ACB.

Montigalà Joventut won their second ACB title, and their 4th overall.

Team Standings

Regular season

Playoffs

Relegation Playoffs

Gran Canaria and Granada were relegated.

Championship Playoffs

External links
 ACB.com 
 linguasport.com 

Liga ACB seasons
Spain